is a former Japanese football player. He played for Japan national team.

Club career
Yoshimizu was born on August 21, 1946. After graduating from Keio University, he joined Furukawa Electric in 1969. He retired in 1972. He played 53 games and scored 6 goals in the league.

National team career
On July 31, 1970, Yoshimizu debuted for Japan national team against Hong Kong. He played 4 games and scored 1 goal for Japan in 1970.

National team statistics

References

1946 births
Living people
Keio University alumni
Japanese footballers
Japan international footballers
Japan Soccer League players
JEF United Chiba players
Association football midfielders